"Velkommen til Medina" is a Danish song by singer Medina, the second big single taken from the album Velkommen til Medina after the big success of her single "Kun for dig" taken from the same album.  

The single was released on 24 July 2009 and topped the Danish Singles Chart for 5 weeks spending a total of 25 weeks on the Danish charts.

Track list 
Single
 "Velkommen til Medina" (Radio Edit)– 3:40
Remixes
 "Velkommen til Medina" – 4:58  	
 "Velkommen til Medina" (Traplite Remix) – 7:10 	
 "Velkommen til Medina" (Svenstrup & Vendelboe Remix) – 5:50 	
 "Velkommen til Medina" (Funkstar Deluxe Remix) – 7:17 	
 "Velkommen til Medina" (Anders K Remix) – 6:34 	
 "Velkommen til Medina" (Massimo & Domz Remix) – 6:36

Versions
An English language version entitled "Welcome to Medina" appears on her internationally released album Welcome to Medina.

Charts

Certification

Year-end Charts

References

2009 singles
Number-one singles in Denmark
Danish-language songs
Songs written by Rasmus Stabell
Songs written by Jeppe Federspiel
2009 songs
Songs written by Medina (singer)
Medina (singer) songs